Kelly Keiko Inouye-Perez (born January 2, 1970) is an American softball player and coach, currently serving as head coach of the UCLA Bruins softball team.  She assumed that position prior to the 2007 season.  She has led the Bruins to five appearances in the Women's College World Series, including the 2010 National Championship and 2019 National Championship and an appearance in the NCAA Division I softball tournament each year of her tenure.

As a player, she was a catcher for UCLA and helped her team to three National Championships and a finish as National Runner-Up in her four playing seasons.  She missed the 1991 season due to shoulder surgery. She is a member of the 2022 class of the UCLA Athletics Hall of Fame.

Head coaching record
Source:

References

1970 births
Living people
Female sports coaches
American softball coaches
UCLA Bruins softball players
UCLA Bruins softball coaches
Softball coaches from California
Softball players from California
Sportspeople from Los Angeles
People from Cerritos, California